"Thunderclouds" is a song by pop music supergroup LSD. It was released on August 9, 2018, by Columbia Records as the third single from LSD's debut studio album of the same name, following "Genius" and "Audio". The song was written by Labrinth, Sia, Diplo,  King Henry, and Jr Blender; while being produced by Labrinth, Diplo, and Jr Blender.

"Thunderclouds" was used as the main theme song for the Samsung Galaxy Note 9 promotional campaign, being featured extensively in parts in the company's ads, as well as at the reveal event in New York on August 9, 2018.

Music video
The official music video for the song, directed by Ernest Desumbila, was released on 30 August 2018. Billboards review called the video "super trippy" and described it as follows: "The group travels across pink and purple skies inside a flying red car piloted by Diplo and housing a living Sia puppet. Labrinth flies on his own personal cloud - a very common theme taken from Chinese mythology - while a mysterious candy-haired girl, played by Maddie Ziegler, dances on top of the car with a Sia-inspired hair-do. The party encounters thunderstorms along the way. … With the power of love, the group eventually finds their way out of the storm and returns to the dazzling pink-clouded skies."

Track listing
Digital download
"Thunderclouds" (Lost Frequencies Remix) – 3:18

Digital download
"Thunderclouds" (MK Remix) – 3:34

Personnel
Credits adapted from Tidal.

 Sia – vocals, lyricist, composer, production
 Diplo – production, programming, lyricist, composer
 Labrinth – production, engineering, programming, vocals, lyricist, composer
 King Henry – production, programming, lyricist, composer
 Jr Blender – programming, preparation, lyricist, composer

 Manny Marroquin – mix engineering
 Chris Galland – mix engineering
 Randy Merrill – master engineering
 Bart Schoudel – engineering
 Robin Florent – engineering assistance
 Scott Desmarais – engineering assistance

Charts

Weekly charts

Year-end charts

Certifications

See also
 Diplo discography
 Labrinth discography
 List of top 10 singles in 2018 (France)
 Sia discography

References

2018 singles
2018 songs
Dance-pop songs
Doo-wop songs
Dub songs
LSD (group) songs
Psychedelic songs
Song recordings produced by Diplo
Song recordings produced by Labrinth
Songs written by Diplo
Songs written by Jr Blender
Songs written by King Henry (producer)
Songs written by Labrinth
Songs written by Sia (musician)
Soul songs
Tropical songs